Severomuysky Tunnel is a railroad tunnel on the Baikal Amur Mainline (BAM), in northwestern Buryatia, Russia. It is named after the Northern Muya Range it cuts through.

Geography
The tunnel cuts under the Severomuysky Range, a mountain ridge separating the Upper Angara basin to the north west from the Muya basin to the south east.  The BAM then follows the valley of the Muyakan River on its way east towards its junction with the Muya shortly before Taksimo.  A works town named after the tunnel was built at each end during its construction; Tonnelny at the western portal and Severomuysk at the eastern portal.  Tonnelny was abandoned in 2004 after the opening of the tunnel and its population relocated to Severomuysk.  Employment in Severomuysk relies almost entirely on the maintenance of the tunnel and its bypass route.

History
Preliminary work on the tunnel started in 1975, with tunneling commencing on May 28, 1977.  The tunnel was built through very difficult rock with four major faults and a great deal of underground water, some at  pressure. One method used was to pump liquid nitrogen into the rock, freezing the water until the cut could be sealed. In September 1979 workers broke into a fault connected to a  underground lake. This required building a drainage tunnel and delayed work for eighteen months.

When it became clear that the tunnel would not be completed in time for the planned official opening of the BAM in 1984, a  bypass was built during the years 1982–83. Passenger traffic was prohibited.

This section featured a large number of tight curves and viaducts, with the long curved bridge built near the tunnel's western portal being nicknamed locally the Devil's Bridge. It was also expensive to maintain and at risk of avalanches.

The tunnel was put into operation on December 5, 2003 (signed off on November 30), with yet another announcement of the completion of the BAM project.

Current status

With the opening of the tunnel, the time required for a train to cross the section has been reduced to only 15 minutes.  However, the newer bypass is still used for westbound trains and local trains to allow eastbound trains to pass through the single-track tunnel.  The opening of the tunnel also allowed  of freight annually to be switched onto the BAM from the Trans-Siberian Railway.

Future
Building a second tunnel would take approximately ten years.

See also
 The Second Severomuysky Tunnel
 Dusse-Alin Tunnel
 List of longest tunnels

References

Athol Yates and Nicholas Zvegentzov, Siberian BAM guide, 2001

Railway tunnels in Russia
Buildings and structures in Buryatia
Rail transport in Siberia
Tunnels completed in 2003
Rail transport in Buryatia